Dirty, not clean.

Dirty may also refer to:

Places 
Dirty Mountain, a mountain in Wyoming
Dirty Point, a summit in Cibola County, New Mexico

People
"Dirty" Dan Denton, a professional wrestler from All Star Wrestling
"Dirty" Dick Slater, a former American professional wrestler
"Dirty John" Meehan, the antagonist of the podcast Dirty John

Arts, entertainment, and media

Films
Dirty (2005 film), an American crime-drama film
Dirty (2020 film), an American short LGBT romance film

Music

Groups and labels
Dirty (group), a rap duo from Alabama
Dirty Records, a New Zealand hip hop record label

Albums
Dirty (Aborym album), 2013
Dirty (One-Eyed Doll album), 2012
Dirty (Sonic Youth album), 1992
Dirty (Malina Moye album)

Songs
"Dirty" (Sevendust song), 2018 song
"Dirty", a song by Audio Adrenaline from Worldwide
"Dirty", a song by Basshunter featuring Sandra from his Calling Time album
"Dirty", a song by Korn from Issues
"Dirty", a song by Pitbull from M.I.A.M.I.
"Dirty", a song by Underworld, 1993

Other uses in arts, entertainment, and media
Dirty (TV series), a television series in development at Amazon
Dirty John (TV series), a TV series based on the eponymous podcast

Other uses
Dirty (computer science), containing data which need to be written back to a larger memory

See also
 "Dirrty", a 2002 song by Christina Aguilera
 Derrty Entertainment, American record label
 Dirt (disambiguation)
 DIRTI 5, five unavoidable fixed costs of production
 Filth (disambiguation)